The 2014–15 Central Coast Mariners FC season was the club's 10th season since its establishment in 2004. The club participated in the A-League for the 10th time and the FFA Cup for the first time.

Players

Squad information

From youth squad

Transfers in

Transfers out

Technical staff

Statistics

Squad statistics

|-
|colspan="24"|Players no longer at the club:

Pre-season and friendlies

Competitions

Overall

A-League

League table

Results summary

Results by round

Matches

FFA Cup

AFC Champions League

Qualifying play-off

Notes

References

External links
 Official Website

Central Coast Mariners
Central Coast Mariners FC seasons